Hughes Bay is a bay lying between Cape Sterneck and Cape Murray along the west coast of the Antarctic Peninsula.

History
The name has appeared on maps for over 100 years, and commemorates Edward Hughes, master of the Sprightly, a sealing vessel owned by the London whaling company Samuel Enderby & Sons, which explored in this area in 1824–25.

Hughes Bay may have been site of the first landing on the Antarctic mainland, by sealers from the U.S. sealing vessel Cecilia under Captain John Davis on February 7, 1821.

Glaciers
The glaciers Tumba Ice Cap, Sikorsky, Mouillard, Cayley, Gregory, Breguet, Blériot, Agalina, Krapets and Zimzelen feed the bay.

See also
Roget Rocks

Maps
 Antarctic Digital Database (ADD). Scale 1:250000 topographic map of Antarctica. Scientific Committee on Antarctic Research (SCAR), 1993–2016.

References

Bays of Graham Land
Danco Coast